Funland is a 1989 novel by Richard Laymon. Set in the resort community of Boleta Bay, a violent gang of unknown assailants is assaulting the guests of the titular amusement park.

Reception
Funland was a finalist for the 1990 Bram Stoker Award for Novel.

References

1989 novels
Novels by Richard Laymon
W. H. Allen & Co. books